The Socialist Party of the Island of Cuba was a political party in Cuba, formed in November 1906 through the merger of the Socialist Workers Party of Carlos Baliños and the International Socialist Group. The party published La Voz Obrera.

References

Defunct political parties in Cuba
Socialist parties in Cuba
1906 establishments in Cuba
Political parties established in 1906